Joyce Kozloff (born 1942) is an American artist whose politically engaged work has been based on cartography since the early 1990s.

Kozloff was one of the original members of the Pattern and Decoration movement and was an early artist in the 1970s feminist art movements. She has been active in the women's and peace movements throughout her life. She was also a founding member of the Heresies collective.

Personal life and education 
Joyce Blumberg was born to Adele Rosenberg and Leonard Blumberg on December 14, 1942 in Somerville, New Jersey. Leonard, born in New Jersey, was an attorney. Adele was active in community organizations. Both of her parents' families had emigrated from Lithuania. She had two younger brothers.

During the summer of 1959, Joyce studied art at New York's Art Students League. In the summer of 1962 she attended Rutgers University and the following summer she attended the Università di Firenze. In 1964 she earned a Bachelor of Fine Arts from the Carnegie Institute of Technology. She then attended Columbia University and received a Masters of Fine Arts in 1967.

She was married to Max Kozloff on July 2, 1967 at her parents' home in Bound Brook, New Jersey by her family's Orthodox rabbi, although she and Max are not religious. They have one son. Kozloff has lived in New York since 1964 except for a year in Los Angeles, California (1970–1971) and a year in Rome, Italy (1999–2000).

Career

Feminist art movement 

She joined with other women in the arts in 1971 to form the Los Angeles Council of Women Artists, a group that organized the first protests about the lack of women included in the Los Angeles County Museum of Art’s exhibitions and collections.  Upon returning to New York, Kozloff continued to be active in the women artists’ movement. She joined the Ad Hoc Committee of Women Artists and was a founding member of the Heresies Collective in 1975, which produced Heresies: A Feminist Publication on Art and Politics, a quarterly magazine about feminism, art and politics.

In the summer of 1973 Kozloff lived in Mexico. In 1975 she visited Morocco and three years later she visited Turkey. She has traveled widely ever since. During her visits she studies the countries' "decorative traditions" and the cultural significance of ornament there. When Kozloff first realized, in the early 1970s, that the decorative arts were the domain of women and non-western artists, she understood that the hierarchy among the arts had privileged the production of European and American men. This fueled her position as a feminist and inspired her interest in pattern design. She is the co-author, with Valerie Jaudon, of the widely anthologized "Art Hysterical Notions of Progress and Culture" (1978), in which she and Jaudon explained how they thought sexist and racist assumptions underlaid Western art history discourse. They reasserted the value of ornamentation and aesthetic beauty - qualities assigned to the feminine sphere.

Kozloff was mentored and inspired by Miriam Schapiro, Nancy Spero, Ida Applebroog and May Stevens.

Kozloff was interviewed for the film !Women Art Revolution.

Pattern and Decoration 

Beginning in 1973, wishing to break down the western hierarchy between "high art" and decoration, Kozloff created large paintings, drawing upon worldwide patterns, juxtaposing ornamental passages across an expansive field. In 1975, she began to meet with artists Miriam Schapiro, Tony Robbin, Robert Zakanitch, Robert Kushner, Valerie Jaudon and others pursuing related ideas; they formed the Pattern and Decoration movement. During the late 1970s, she produced An Interior Decorated, an installation composed of hanging silkscreen textile panels; hand painted, glazed tile pilasters; lithographs on Chinese silk paper; and a tiled floor composed of thousands of individually executed images on interlocking stars and hexagons. The project was redesigned for every space in which it was exhibited in 1979 and 1980. Just as her paintings had nonwestern origins, for this installation, she compiled a personal, visual anthology of the decorative arts from dozens of sources, including Caucasian kilims, İznik and Catalan tiles, Seljuk brickwork, and Native American pottery. "An Interior Decorated is where painting meets architecture, where art meets craft, where personal commitment meets public art", wrote Carrie Rickey, art critic.

Public art 
Kozloff became interested in public art when studying under Robert Lepper at Carnegie Mellon in Pittsburgh. He taught the Oakland Project, in which students went out into the Oakland neighborhood and made art documenting the infrastructure, buildings and people. She said, "That was my initiation into public art -- into the world outside". The mural in the Harvard Square subway station, Cambridge, MA, her first public artwork, was obtained through a competition. Most of the rest of her public projects were directly commissioned. Her initial large scale pieces were composed of interlocking patterns of glass mosaic and/or ceramic tiles, an extension of her earlier gallery art. She began incorporating images from the cities' histories, so as to make the works site specific. For instance, at the Suburban Station in Philadelphia, she substituted an image of William Penn for the Good Shepherd in an appropriation of the famous Byzantine Tomb of Galla Placidia in Ravenna, Italy. The works were often collaborative efforts, involving input from the public, community boards, architects, and arts patrons.

Kozloff created 16 public art projects, including:

 1983 - Bay Area Victorian, Bay Area Deco, Bay Area Funk, at San Francisco Airport's International Terminal
 1984 - an homage to Frank Furness at Wilmington Station in Delaware
 1984 - Humboldt-Hospital Subway Station, Buffalo, New York.
 1985 - New England Decorative Arts, her first public mural, at Harvard Square subway station in Cambridge.
 1985 - One Penn Center, Suburban Train Station, her first completely mosaic work, in Philadelphia
 1987 - "D" for Detroit, Financial District Station: Detroit People Mover elevated rail system, Michigan
 1989 - Underwater Landscapes, Home Savings of America, Atrium, Irwindale, California
 1989 - Gardens at Villandry with Angels for Los Angeles and Gardens at Villandry and Chenonceaux with Orange Festoons for Los Angeles, Home Savings of America Tower, Community Redevelopment Agency of the City of Los Angeles
 1990 - Pasadena, the City of Roses, Plaza las Fuentes, Pasadena, California
 1991 - Caribbean Festival Arts, Public School 218, New York City
 1992 - Member, Open Space Design Team, Riverside South Corporation, New York
 1993 - The Movies: Fantasies and Spectacles, Los Angeles Metro’s 7th and Flower Station
 1995 - Around the World on the 44th Parallel, Memorial Library, Mankato State University
 1997 - Four cartographic representations based on ancient charts of the Chesapeake Bay area, Reagan National Airport, Washington, DC. It is a marble mosaic.
 2001 - a floor piece for Chubu Cultural Center, Kurayoshi, Japan
 2002 - Florida Revisited, Fairway Office Center, West Palm Beach, Florida.
 2003 - Dreaming: The Passage of Time, United States Consulate, Istanbul, Turkey.

She was interested in public art because it makes art accessible to everyone, and not just the public and private collectors, but became disheartened after the 1990s political "culture wars", felt that she'd have to censor her creative expression to create acceptable "safe art", and discontinued vying for public art commissions.

Artist's books 
In the late 1980s she produced a series of 32 watercolors entitled Patterns of Desire—Pornament is Crime, published by Hudson Hills Press in 1990 with an introductory essay by Linda Nochlin. This book by a feminist artist juxtaposed the obsessive nature of both decoration and pornography in many traditions, to comic and revelatory effect. A founding member of the New York activist group, Artists Against the War (2003), Kozloff has been increasingly preoccupied with that theme. In 2001, she began Boy's Art, a series of twenty-four drawings based on illustrations, diagrams, and maps depicting historic battles, over which she collaged copies of her son Nikolas’s childhood war drawings and details from old master paintings. An oversized artist’s book of these works was published by D.A.P./Distributed Art Publishers in 2003 with an introductory essay by Robert Kushner. In 2010, Charta Books Ltd. published Kozloff’s third artist’s book, China is Near, which includes a conversation with Barbara Pollack. For this publication, the artist photographed the China most accessible to her, New York’s Chinatown, a few blocks from her home, as well as other Chinatowns within range. She copied old charts of the Silk Road and downloaded online maps of all the places in the world called China.  It’s a bright, glossy mash-up of contemporary kitsch and historic commerce, a guide to the global highway.

Map themes 

Kozloff has utilized mapping since the early 1990s as a structure for her long-time passions - history, geography, popular arts and culture. In Los Angeles Becoming Mexico City Becoming Los Angeles (1993) and Imperial Cities (1994) she painted cities she knew, overlaying images and patterns reflective of their colonial pasts. She subsequently examined bodies of water such as the Baltic Sea in Bodies of Water, the Mekong and Amazon Rivers in Mekong and memory and Calvino’s Cities on the Amazon (1995–1997). In her series Knowledge (1998–1999), consisting of 65 small (8 x 10") frescoes and six tabletop globes, she depicted the inaccuracies of maps from earlier times, particularly during the Age of Discovery, to reveal the arbitrary nature of what can be known.

In 1999–2000, during Kozloff’s year-long fellowship at the American Academy in Rome, she executed Targets, a walk-in globe  in diameter made of 24 gore-shaped sections. She painted an aerial map on

the inside surface of each section to depict a site bombed by the United States military between the years 1945 and 2000.  Upon entering, the visitor is completely surrounded, and if he/she makes a sound there is an echo amplified by the enclosed space. Two multi-panel, -long works followed, each in the form of the flattened gores of a globe (2002): Spheres of Influence (Kozloff’s "terrestrial piece") and Dark and Light Continents (her "celestial piece").

For several years, Kozloff worked on a huge installation about the history of western colonialism, shown at Thetis in the Venice Arsenale (2006), Voyages + Targets. She painted islands across the world on 64 Venetian Carnival masks situated inside windows with light streaming through their eyes; hanging from the ceiling and along the brick walls, there were banners (Voyages: Carnevale, Voyages: Maui, and Voyages: Kaho’olawe) with maps of islands in the Pacific and jazzy carnival imagery as it has morphed around the planet. Beginning in 2006, Kozloff’s ongoing tondi (round paintings) began with Renaissance cosmological charts crisscrossed by the tracks of satellites in space, an imaginary projection of future (star) wars (the days and hours and moments of our lives, Helium on the Moon, Revolver).

"Descartes' Heart" is based on the heart-shaped map, Cosmographia universalis ab Orontio olin descripta, by Renaissance cartographer Giovanni Cimerlino (Verona, 1566). On the top is a totally wacky map called Mechanical Universe by Descartes (1644). The tondi were followed by an -long triptych, The Middle East: Three Views (2010), a projection of the contested areas in that region during the Roman era, the Cold War, and currently. The maps, based on photographs taken by NASA’s Hubble Space Telescope, float in deep space among the stars, as if they had been dislodged from the earth.

Awards and honors 
 1975 - American Association of University Women's Selected Professions Fellowship
 1977 - National Endowment for the Arts Individual Artist grant in Painting
 1985 - National Endowment for the Arts Individual Artist grant in Drawings, Prints and Artists’ Books
 1992 - Rockefeller Foundation Bellagio fellowship
2002 - Elected into the National Academy of Design
 2004 - John Simon Guggenheim Memorial Foundation fellowship
 2005 - Alumni Award, Carnegie Mellon University
 2009 - Lifetime Achievement Award from the Women’s Caucus for Art
 2011 - ArtTable Artist Honor
2015 - Honorary Doctorate, Carnegie Mellon University, Pittsburgh, PA

Collections 
Her art is in numerous museum collections, including:

 Albright-Knox Art Gallery, Buffalo, NY
 Brooklyn Museum, Brooklyn, NY
 Fogg Art Museum, Harvard University, Cambridge, MA
 Indianapolis Museum of Art, Indianapolis, IN
 Jewish Museum, New York, NY
 Library of Congress, Washington, DC
 Los Angeles County Museum of Art, Los Angeles, CA
 M. H. de Young Memorial Museum, San Francisco, CA
 Metropolitan Museum of Art, New York, NY
 MIT List Visual Arts Center, Cambridge, MA
 Museum of Fine Arts, Santa Fe, NM
 Museum of Modern Art, New York, NY
 National Academy of Design, NY
 National Gallery of Art, Washington, DC
 National Museum of Women in the Arts, Washington, DC
 Ludwig Forum für Internationale Kunst (formerly Neue Galerie Sammlung Ludwig), Aachen, Germany
 New Jersey State Museum, Trenton, NJ
 Smithsonian American Art Museum, Washington, DC
 Whitney Museum of American Art, New York, NY
 Yale University Art Museum, New Haven, CT

Exhibitions 
Kozloff has had group and solo exhibitions since 1970 in many US cities, including New York, Philadelphia, Boston, Los Angeles, Chicago, and Washington, DC She had a traveling exhibition with her husband Max, "Crossed Purposes", that started in Youngstown, Ohio and traveled to eight other museums and university galleries in the US from 1998 to 2000. International exhibitions include Italy, Germany, the Netherlands, Belgium, Argentina, and Denmark.

Most recently, Kozloff's work has been included in several national and international museum exhibitions focusing on the Pattern and Decoration movement: With Pleasure: Pattern and Decoration in American Art 1972-1985, Museum of Contemporary Art, Los Angeles, CA (2019-2020); Less is a Bore: Maximalist Art & Design, Institute for Contemporary Art, Boston, MA (2019); Pattern and Decoration: Ornament as Promise, Ludwig Forum, Aachen, Germany, Museum Moderner Kunst Stiftung Vienna, Austria, and Ludwig Museum, Budapest, Hungary (2018-2019); Pattern, Decoration & Crime, MAMCO, Geneva, Switzerland, and Le Consortium, Dijon, France (2018-2019).

Kozloff is represented by DC Moore Gallery in New York City and has been exhibiting there since 1997.

Publications 
Joyce Kozloff. China Is Near. Interview by Barbara Pollack. Milano: Charta, 2010.
Joyce Kozloff.  Boys' Art. Introduction by Robert Kushner. New York: Distributed Art Publishers, Inc., 2003.
 Joyce Kozloff. Patterns of Desire. Introduction by Linda Nochlin. New York: Hudson Hills Press, 1990.
Joyce Kozloff and Zucker, Barbara.  “The Women’s Movement: Still a ‘source of strength’ or ‘one big bore’?” ARTnews, April 1976, 48-50.
Joyce Kozloff. “Thoughts on My Art”. Name Book I. Chicago: Name Gallery, 1977, 63-68.
Joyce Kozloff. “An Ornamented Joke”. Artforum, December 1986.
Joyce Kozloff. “The Kudzu Effect (or the rise of a new academy)”. Public Art Review, Fall/Winter 1996, 41.
Joyce Kozloff. “Portals”. Public Art Dialogue. Abingdon, Oxon, UK: Taylor & Francis, 2014.

Further reading

Books and exhibition catalogs

Articles, essays and reviews 

Bastisch, Miriam. “Joyce Kozloff and the P&D Movement”, mused, April 10, 2013. http://www.mused-mosaik.de/en/2013/04/10/joyce-kozloff-2/
Breidenbach, Tom. "Joyce Kozloff", Artforum (March 2004).
Brown, Betty Ann, “All Over the Map, The Peripatetic Aesthetic of Joyce Kozloff”, Artillery Magazine, col.7 issue 3, January–February 2013.
Busch, Akiko. “Accessories of Destination: The Recent Work of Joyce Kozloff”, American Ceramics 21, 1, 1995, 26-31.
Castro, Jan. "Joyce Kozloff." Sculpture (September, 2001).
Cotter, Holland. "Scaling a Minimalist Wall With Bright, Shiny Colors", The New York Times, January 15, 2008.
Frankel, David. "Joyce Kozloff." Artforum (September 1999).
Goldin, Amy. “Pattern & Print”, The Print Collector’s Newsletter, March/April 1978, 10-13.
Hottle, Andrew D. “Nancy Princenthal and Phillip Earenfight, Joyce Kozloff: Co-Ordinates”, Aurora, The Journal of the History of Art, January 1, 2010.
Jaudon, Valerie and Joyce Kozloff. "Art Hysterical Notions of Progress and Culture", Heresies IV (Winter 1978).
Koplos, Janet. "Revisiting the Age of Discovery", Art in America (July 1999).
Kushner, Robert. "Underground Movies in L.A." Art in America (December 1994).
Molarsky, Mona. "Joyce Kozloff: DC Moore." ARTnews (December 2010).
Perreault, John. "Issues in Pattern Painting", Artforum 16 (November 1977).
Perrone, Jeff. "Approaching the Decorative", Artforum (December 1976).
Perrone, Jeff. "Joyce Kozloff", Artforum (November 1979).
Phelan, Peggy. "Crimes of Passion", Artforum 28  (May 1990).
Princenthal, Nancy. "Joyce Kozloff at DC Moore", Art in America (February 2004).
Rickey, Carrie. "Decoration, Ornament, Pattern and Utility: Four Tendencies in Search of a Movement", Flash Art 90–91 (June–July 1979).
Rickey, Carrie. "Joyce Kozloff", Arts (January 1978).
Riddle, Mason. "A Sense of Time, A Sense of Place", American Ceramics (Summer 1988).
Rubinstein, Rafael Meyer. “Patterns of Desire”, Arts, May 1991.
Sandler, Irving. “Modernism, Revisionism, Pluralism, and Post-Modernism”, Art Journal, Fall/Winter 1980.
Smith, Roberta. "Art in Review: Joyce Kozloff", The New York Times, March 19, 1999.
Webster, Sally. "Pattern and Decoration in the Public Eye", Art in America 75/2 (February 1987).

Interviews 

 
Braderman, Joan. The Heretics. Northampton, MA: No More Nice Girls Productions, 2009.
Freed, Hermine. Joyce Kozloff: Public Art Works. Hermine Freed Video Productions, New York, NY, 1996.
Goldberg, Vicki. Working Notes: An Interview with Joyce and Max Kozloff. Art Journal, Fall 2000, 96-103.
Hershman, Lynn Leeson. W.A.R. !Women Art Revolution: The (Formerly) Secret History, San Francisco, CA: Hotwire Productions, 2010.
Lin, Jia. Joyce Kozloff. Art World: Snacks. Shanghai, China: March 2011, 50-51. 
Pollack, Barbara. Joyce Kozloff. Journal of Contemporary Art, Fall 1992, 29-35.
Reilly, Maura. Elizabeth A.  Sackler Center for Feminist Art, Brooklyn, NY, 2008.
Richards, Judith. “Oral History Interview with Joyce Kozloff, “ Archives of American Art,  www.aaa.si.edu/, July 12–13, 2011.
Swartz, Anne. Pattern and Decoration: The Great Untold Story. The Savannah College of Art and Design, 1999.
Swartz, Anne. Otis presents Pioneers of the Feminist Art Movement: Joyce Kozloff. Los Angeles, CA: Ben Maltz Gallery, Otis College of Art andDesign, October, 2011. https://www.youtube.com/watch?v=W9hCObXWwyA&feature=feedwll&list=WL.
Sims, Patterson. Working on the Railroad, Whitney Museum of American Art, Stamford, CT, 1985.
Stein, Linda. “The Art Perspective Joyce Kozloff”, On The Issues, winter 2009, http://www.ontheissuesmagazine.com/2009winter/2009winter_art.php
Tschinkel, Paul. ART/New York, Tape No. 15 - New Public Art (Joyce Kozloff, Keith Haring, John Ahearn), ART/New York. Inner-Tube Video, New York, NY, 1983.
Wrest, Ronnie. "Joyce Kozloff" The Citrus Report, April 12, 2011.

References

External links
 Joyce Kozloff's Website
 DC Moore Gallery
 Heresies Film Project
 Women Art Revolution exhibit
 DAP (Distributed Art Publishers)
Joyce Kozloff on Artsy

1942 births
American women painters
American contemporary painters
Feminist artists
Living people
Carnegie Mellon University College of Fine Arts alumni
Columbia University School of the Arts alumni
People from Somerville, New Jersey
Artists from New Jersey
20th-century American women artists
21st-century American women artists
Heresies Collective members